The Cromer Shoal Chalk Beds are a chalk reef off the coast Norfolk in the United Kingdom, believed to be the largest chalk reef in Europe. Since January 2016, an area around it has been designated as a Marine Conservation Zone. Although the MCZ is named after chalk beds off Cromer the most dramatic features are off Sheringham. A chalk bedrock seabed actually extends under much of the Southern North Sea and is exposed underwater and at the shore - as veneers of sand and sediment move with sea action. The chalk is most notably exposed at the shore as rock pools at West Runton. They are home to more than 700 marine species, including a species of purple Hymedesmia sponge unique to the area first identified there in 2011.

The Marine Conservation Zone. has an area of about 321 km2, starting 200 m away from the coastline and extending about 10 km out into the North Sea, it stretches from west of Weybourne to Happisburgh. The 200 m offset was applied due to pressure from local communities who believed the designation would prevent sea defense work if it reached the high tide mark. This was a mistake as MCZ status does not bring any default prohibition of coastal works.

References 

Marine conservation
North Sea
Norfolk
Reefs of England
Coastal geography
Landforms of the North Sea
Marine reserves of England